The Old Colony Lines are a pair of branches of the MBTA Commuter Rail system, connecting downtown Boston, Massachusetts with the South Shore and cranberry-farming country to the south and southeast. The two branches operate concurrently for  via the Old Colony Mainline from South Station to Braintree station. The Middleborough/Lakeville Line then winds south through Holbrook, Brockton, Bridgewater, Middleborough, and Lakeville via the Middleborough Main Line and Cape Main Line. The Kingston/Plymouth Line heads southeast to serve Weymouth, Abington, Whitman, Hanson, Halifax, Kingston, and Plymouth by way of the Plymouth branch.

History

The Old Colony under the New Haven
Historically, train service extended beyond the current terminus of the three branches.  Greenbush service continued on a now-abandoned right-of-way to Kingston, where it joined the Plymouth line.  The Plymouth line extended into downtown Plymouth, and a branch connected to Middleborough through Carver.  Trains continued southeast from Middleboro to four different termini on Cape Cod: Woods Hole, Hyannis, Chatham, and Provincetown.  Another major branch continued southwest to New Bedford, and another to Newport via Fall River. A number of minor branches also extended off the main lines.  These included branches to Hull, East Bridgewater, West Bridgewater, North Hanover, and Fairhaven.  None of these branches are currently operational.

Passenger service along the Old Colony Railroad was discontinued in 1959.  Despite high ridership, this line had been a source of problems for the New Haven Railroad, which leased the system.  In 1935, the bankrupt New Haven attempted to default on its lease and return ownership of the line to the Old Colony stockholders; however, this drove the Old Colony, which had not run trains in over thirty years, to bankruptcy in one day, and the New Haven was forced to run the trains by court order, with a provision that, if losses exceeded a certain amount, they could abandon the line.  The Old Colony Division enjoyed a brief renaissance in the early 1950s under the pro-commuter term of President Frederick C. Dumaine, Jr.; however, this was not to last.  The New Haven's accountants used somewhat dubious practices to shift a greater amount of debt to the Old Colony Division, and the railroad announced that all passenger service would end in 1958.  An emergency subsidy was approved by the Commonwealth of Massachusetts for another year, and service finally ended in 1959 with the opening of the Southeast Expressway, which runs alongside the Old Colony right-of-way in many sections.  The approaches to the bridge over the Neponset River burned soon afterwards, making any restoration of service significantly more difficult.

Restoration of service

As congestion and pollution became issues on the expressway, projects were undertaken to revive service on these railways. The line, with state-of-the-art park-and-ride stations, proved an instant success, lending strength to proposals to restore commuter rail service to the Old Colony lines via Braintree. The Cape Cod and Hyannis Railroad ran passenger service from Cape Cod to Braintree (and briefly to ) in the 1980s, but failed when its state subsidy was ended amid budget cuts.

Freight service continued on the Cape Main Line through Brockton and Middleborough and the Old Colony mainline to Plymouth even after passenger service ended, so the lines were not abandoned when restoration planning began around 1990. Both lines received a full restoration for  passenger service, including passing sidings and fully handicapped accessible stations with full-length high-level platforms. Tracks were laid parallel to the Red Line along the original right-of-way, including a new two-track bridge over the Neponset River. The first trains ran on September 26, 1997, with full rush hour service on the 29th. The third leg of the project, the Greenbush Line, was planned to reopen at the same time. Due to public opposition, the Greenbush Line did not open until 2007; it is considered separate from the Old Colony Lines.

Weekend service and tie replacement

Weekend and off-peak service on the Old Colony Lines (including the first service to Plymouth, which is not served during rush hours) began as planned on November 29, 1997, two months after rush hour service began.  Greenbush service included weekend and off-peak service from the beginning of operations.

In May 2010, the MBTA announced a plan to temporarily stop all weekend service and to replace non-peak weekday service with buses.  The shutdowns were for the purposes of replacing defective concrete ties (which had begun failing far earlier than expected) with wooden ones.  Tie replacement started in March 2011 and was substantially complete by September, although the full project – which includes grade crossing and bridge work – was expected to take until the summer of 2012.  The project was fully completed by May 26, 2012.

On March 28, 2012, the MBTA announced that Plymouth/Kingston Line service would no longer operate on weekends, as with the Needham Line and Greenbush Line.  The move came as a part of fare increases and service cuts in order to close the agency's operating budget shortfall for the following year.  Weekend service was eliminated beginning July 7, 2012; weekend service was kept for the first week of the new fiscal year to allow for service on the July 4th holiday.  Middleborough/Lakeville service continued to operate on weekends. In fiscal year 2013, the Middleborough/Lakeville line averaged 7,182 and the Kingston/Plymouth Line 6,560 one-way riders per weekday, for a combined daily ridership of 13,742 – a substantial decrease from daily averages exceeding 19,000 several years before.

In early 2014, local and state officials began agitating for the return of weekend service on the Plymouth/Kingston Line. Weekend service on the Plymouth/Kingston Line, as well as weekend service on the Greenbush Line and Saturday service on the Needham Line, resumed on December 27, 2014. Prior to the return of weekend service on the Kingston/Plymouth Line, the MBTA held special weekend service to Plymouth for two weekends leading up to the 2014 Thanksgiving holiday. The two trains per day were intended only for tourists going to Plymouth; they did not run on schedules allowing day trips to Boston.

COVID-19 pandemic
Substantially reduced schedules were in effect from March 16 to June 23, 2020. Schedule changes effective November 2, 2020, added midday service with consistent 60–70 minute midday headways on the Middleborough/Lakeville Line, though a pilot of late-night service was discontinued.

The fork at the end of the Kingston/Plymouth Line (which lacks a wye) creates operational issues – a single train cannot serve both terminal stations efficiently. The MBTA had intended to address this issue with schedule changes since 2015. In November 2020, as part of service cuts during the pandemic, the MBTA proposed to close  along with five other low-ridership stations on other lines. On December 14, the MBTA Board voted to enact a more limited set of cuts, including indefinitely closing Plymouth and four of the other five stations. That day, temporary reduced schedules were again put into place.

On January 23, 2021, reduced schedules went into place with no weekend service on seven lines, including the Kingston/Plymouth Line. Plymouth station closed on April 5, 2021, with the line renamed the Kingston Line. As part of that schedule change, the regional rail-style service introduced in November 2020 was resumed on the Middleborough/Lakeville Line and added on the Kingston Line. Additionally, the last Kingston-bound train of the night departs from Braintree station, with a timed transfer from a Middleborough/Lakeville Line train. Weekend service on the Kingston line and the six other lines resumed on July 3, 2021. In June 2021, the MBTA indicated that Plymouth station would reopen on July 5, 2022 (the start of a new fiscal year). The station did not reopen at that time, however, with a date for service restoration not announced.

, the Kingston Line has 13 weekday round trips and eight on weekends, while the Middleborough/Lakeville Line has 15 weekday round trips and 10 on weekends. By October 2022, Kingston service was at 69% of pre-COVID ridership, with Middleborough/Lakeville service at 77%.

Cape Cod service

Original plans for the reopening of the Middleborough/Lakeville Line in the 1990s called for service to Wareham or beyond; however, plans were scaled back, and, when the line reopened in 1997, service was restored only to Middleborough/Lakeville.  In 2007, the Boston Region Metropolitan Planning Organization released a report evaluating the possibility of extending regular full-year commuter rail service to Buzzards Bay (on the north side of the Cape Cod Canal opposite Bourne), including several intermediate stops.  However, other projects (such as the restoration of service on the Greenbush Line) received priority, and the extension to Buzzards Bay was not constructed.

The CapeFLYER service to Hyannis on Cape Cod via the Middleborough/Lakeville Line began in May 2013.  The service is operated by the Cape Cod Regional Transit Authority (CCRTA), in collaboration with the MBTA and the Massachusetts Department of Transportation (MassDOT); it uses standard MBTA commuter equipment.  The CapeFLYER is the first regular passenger service to Cape Cod from Boston since the 1960s.

The relative success of the CapeFLYER has brought new attention to the possibility of extending the Middleborough/Lakeville Line to Buzzards Bay.  The possibility was seriously discussed before the end of its first summer season.  In September 2013, the Wareham Chamber of Commerce announced that, based on the success of the CapeFLYER, the Chamber supported the extension of commuter rail service to Buzzards Bay.  The Buzzards Bay town selectmen similarly supported the idea later that year, and a public forum was held in January 2014.

Bourne's Transportation Advisory Committee began studying the possibility in mid-2014, with the addition of work by MassDOT's Central Transportation Planning Staff (CTPS) in November 2014. The CTPS data estimated ridership at 875 daily riders if all Middleborough trains were extended to Buzzards Bay, or slightly fewer with a limited number of trains.

Bourne voted to join the MBTA district in 2015 and began paying an assessment in mid 2016 (for FY 2017), although there was no guarantee that commuter rail service would be provided in the fiscally constrained environment.  For FY 2017, Bourne paid $41,707 to the MBTA (plus an existing $88,429 to the CCRTA for existing bus service).  MassDOT began planning a possible commuter rail trial service in October 2015.  In February 2016, state representatives and CCRTA administrator Thomas Cahir said that the state wished to begin trial service during FY 2017—possibly by the end of 2016. While such trial service was ultimately not implemented, the MBTA began conducting a study in late 2020 to evaluate the feasibility of implementing Buzzards Bay commuter rail service in conjunction with the currently-underway South Coast Rail project.

South Coast Rail
An extension from the Middleboro/Lakeville Line along the Middleboro Secondary is being constructed to temporarily connect Boston to Fall River and New Bedford as part of the South Coast Rail project. This is expected to operated from 2023 to 2030. After that, the Middleboro/Lakeville Line is expected to terminate at Pilgrim Junction on the Middleboro Secondary, and South Coast Rail is scheduled to use a longer permanent extension from Stoughton.

Station list

Kingston

Middleborough/Lakeville Line

References

External links

MBTA – Old Colony Lines schedules

MBTA Commuter Rail
Old Colony Railroad lines